"What Is Love (Baby Don't Hurt Me)" is a song recorded by Trinidadian-German Eurodance artist Haddaway for his debut album, The Album (1993). The song was released in 1993 as the album's lead single. It was a hit in Europe, becoming a number-one hit in at least 13 countries and reaching number two in Germany, Sweden, and the United Kingdom. Outside Europe, the single was a hit worldwide, reaching number 11 in the United States, number 12 in Australia, number 17 in Canada, and number 48 in New Zealand. The song earned Haddaway two awards at the German 1994 Echo Award, in the categories "Best National Single" and "Best National Dance Single".

Background

"What Is Love" was written and produced by German music producer and composer Dee Dee Halligan (Dieter Lünstedt a.k.a. Tony Hendrik) and his partner/wife Junior Torello (Karin Hartmann-Eisenblätter a.k.a. Karin van Haaren) of Coconut Records in Hennef (Sieg) near Cologne. They had previously produced songs for successful groups like Bad Boys Blue and Londonbeat, and were waiting for the right singer for their new song. Trinidadian-born singer Nestor Alexander Haddaway was then chosen to sing it. He used to work as a producer, dancer and choreographer before he was signed to the label. The producers wanted Haddaway to try singing the song like Joe Cocker. He told them, "I love Joe Cocker, but I'm no Joe Cocker." He then came up with his own idea on how to sing it and after the producers let the singer try it his way, "What Is Love" was created. Hendrik would lock himself in the studio, and eight or nine days later he came out with the song as we know it. 

The female vocal on the track, meanwhile, was a stock sample released on the Zero-G sample compilation CD "Datafile 1" (tracks 62-64), which was produced in 1991 by Zero-G co-founder and Jack 'N' Chill member Ed Stratton, aka Man Machine, and was aimed at dance producers, DJs, programmers and artists.

Chart performance
"What Is Love" reached number one in 13 countries: Austria, Belgium, Denmark, Finland, France, Ireland, Italy, Netherlands, Norway, Portugal, Spain, Switzerland and Zimbabwe. In Sweden, Germany and the United Kingdom, it peaked at number two. In the latter, the song reached that position on the UK Singles Chart in its fifth week on the chart, on 27 June 1993. Additionally, "What Is Love" was a number three hit in Iceland, and it made it to the top spot also on the Eurochart Hot 100. Debuting at number 87 on 28 August 1993, the song reached number 11 on the Billboard Hot 100 in the United States. But on the US Cash Box Top 100, it reached number nine. The song also peaked at number 12 in Australia. By March 1994, worldwide sales of "What Is Love" had already reached 2.6 million.

Critical reception
Upon the release, Larry Flick from Billboard described the song as a "glorious pop/house ditty", and stated that "wildly catchy chorus is complemented by a slick, synth-happy arrangement. Haddaway will conjure up images of Seal and Sydney Youngblood with his worldly baritone delivery. A sure-fire dance hit that has the muscle to push its way onto pop formats with ease." Milo Miles from The Boston Globe wrote, "He pours such delicacy and anguish into the short phrases they become loud whispers that stay in the ear. With perfectly lubricated synthesizers bouncing away behind him, Haddaway gets precious mileage out of minimal lyrics." Student newspaper Columbia Daily Spectator said it "will transport you instantly to the golden age of house music." Jim Farber from Daily News noted that "What Is Love" "uses every sound it has to punch the beat: a stabbing synth line, a tense bass, an uplifting lead vocal and an encouragingly frantic female voice to back it up. It's a sound at once insinuating and insistent, sensual and wild." He also deemed it "the world's natural followup" to Robin S.' "Show Me Love". Dave Sholin from the Gavin Report commented, "Try sitting still seconds after this upbeat entry kicks in." He also noted that Haddaway's style is "reminscent  of the Fine Young Cannibals and just as exciting." 

In his weekly UK chart commentary, James Masterton stated that the song "is undoubtedly one of the best soul releases of the year." Pan-European magazine Music & Media remarked that it has a "fast house beat augmented by Nestor Haddaway's deeply soulful vocals. This is definitely on par with anything that has come out of Chicago's deep house scene for quite some time." Wendi Cermak from The Network Forty described the track as "splendiferous", and noted that "the eargasmic synth stabs in the extended mix are pulling even odds in Vegas for dance-floor-filling capability and the edit screams for radio airplay..." Luke Turner from The Quietus felt that "What Is Love" "bangs because it manages to be two things—a terrific soul tune but also rather stern as well, with infernally naggy synth lines and drilled repetition in the rhythms." Tony Cross from Smash Hits gave it four out of five, writing, "Haddaway's attempt at producing something along the lines of Seal's Crazy hasn't quite been pulled off, but this foot-friendly dance track is still stonking dance-floor stuff. You don't find out what love is, but that doesn't mean you'll be disappointed." Another editor, Pete Stanton declared it as "a disco-dancing, ass-grooving, tum-churning corker of a song."

Retrospective response
AllMusic editor Jose F. Promis named "What Is Love" "one of the 1990s' quintessential dance tunes". In an 2015 retrospective review, Victor Beigelman from The A.V. Club declared it as a "Europop banger that more than 20 years later remains relentlessly catchy and far more profound than it ever had any right to be." Mike Wood from Idolator featured it in their list of "The 50 Best Pop Singles of 1994" in 2014, calling it a "catchy" anthem, that "permeated our collective consciousness given the heavily-repeated airplay".

Music video
The accompanying music video of "What Is Love" was directed by German music video director Volker Hannwacker. It features Haddaway in a mansion pursued by three femme fatales, one of whom is a vampire. The video received heavy rotation on MTV Europe.

Accolades

(*) indicates the list is unordered.

In popular culture
"What is Love" experienced a revival as the song from the Saturday Night Live "Roxbury Guys" sketches later expanded into the 1998 feature film A Night at the Roxbury, where two brothers (played by Chris Kattan and Will Ferrell) frequently went to dance clubs with a third person (including actors such as Sylvester Stallone and Jim Carrey), credited as "Barhop". It was also used in the 2013 video game Saints Row IV and included as one of the tracks in Just Dance 2017. The song was also sung by Ulysses Klaue (played by Andy Serkis) while being interrogated by Everett K. Ross (played by Martin Freeman) in the 2018 film Black Panther. The song was also featured and in the animated series Close Enough, with Emily Ramirez (voiced by Gabrielle Walsh) and Bridgette Hashima (voiced by Kimiko Glenn) sing a Weird Al Yankovic-styled parody version of it.

Formats and track listings

"What Is Love"
 CD single / 7"
"What Is Love" – 4:28
"Sing About Love" – 3:12

 12" maxi-single
"What Is Love" (12" mix) – 6:40
"What Is Love" (7" mix) – 4:27
"What Is Love" (club mix) – 5:00
"Sing About Love" – 4:40

 CD single, United Kingdom
"What Is Love" (radio edit 7" mix) – 3:57
"What Is Love" (club mix) – 5:00
"What Is Love" (12" mix) – 6:40
"What Is Love" (tour de trance mix) – 6:00
"What Is Love" (refreshmento Extro Mix) – 5:42

 CD maxi, France
"What Is Love" (7" mix) – 4:29
"What Is Love" (12" mix) – 6:40
"What Is Love" (club mix) – 5:02
"Sing About Love" – 4:36

"What Is Love" – remix
 CD single, France
"What Is Love" (eat-this mix – radio edit) – 4:19
"What Is Love" (refreshmento extro mix) – 3:52

 CD maxi
"What Is Love" – remix (eat-this mix) – 6:54
"What Is Love" (tour de trance-mix) – 6:00
"What Is Love" (7" mix) – 4:27

"What Is Love" – reloaded
 CD maxi
"What Is Love" – reloaded (video mix) – 3:16
"What Is Love" – reloaded (reloaded mix) – 6:09
"What Is Love" – reloaded (what is club mix) – 6:39
"What Is Love" – reloaded (Jens O.'s hard remix) – 5:32
"What Is Love" – reloaded (Nathan Jolly's NRG remix) – 6:48
"What Is Love" – reloaded (radio edit) – 2:56
"What Is Love" – reloaded (lunaris remix) – 6:21

Charts

Weekly charts

Original version

"What Is Love" – Remix

"What Is Love" – Reloaded

Other reissues

Year-end charts

Decade-end charts

Certifications and sales

Release history

Cover versions and sampling
In 2007, the song was covered by indie band The Gossip, with lead singer Beth Ditto changing the lyrics to "When Is Lunch?, Baby I'm Hungry, I'm Hungry, For More".
In 2009, singer and songwriter Diane Birch completely rearranged the song, that later was featured on Billboard magazine's Mashup Monday in 2010.
In 2010, Swedish boy band E.M.D. released a piano ballad version of "What Is Love" as the second single from their sophomore studio album Rewind.
In 2010, American rappers Eminem and Lil Wayne sampled the song for the single "No Love" from Eminem's seventh studio album, Recovery.
In 2014, Canadian singer Kiesza did a "piano-and-synth cover" of the song.
In 2016, Belgian DJ Lost Frequencies did his own cover.

Klaas version

In 2009, German DJ Klaas remixed the song under the title "Klaas meets Haddaway – What Is Love 2K9". This remix charted in several European countries.

Lost Frequencies version

In 2016, Belgian DJ Lost Frequencies released a cover titled "What Is Love 2016", as a single from his debut album Less Is More. It was actually already produced back in 2014 as a remix for Jaymes Young's cover version of "What is Love". This version was remade for the album and became a hit on a number of European singles charts and topped the Belgian Ultratop Official Singles Chart.

Music video
An official music video was released directed by Soulvizion. It features the Dutch professional basketball player Don Rigters who plays the role of David Rose, a basketball player who is severely injured trying to make a comeback to the game with encouragement from his girlfriend, (played by Melissa Kanza), his three teammates, (Alkenah Wansing, Jeroen Jansen and Lindy Chippendel) and by his basketball coach (played by J E Rigters).

Track listing
Armada / Mostiko, 7 October 2016
"What Is Love 2016" – 2:52

Armada / Mostiko, 28 October 2016
What Is Love 2016" (Regi & Lester Williams Remix) – 4:21

Lost & Cie / Armada, 11 November 2016
"What Is Love 2016" (Regi & Lester Williams Remix) – 3:08
"What Is Love 2016" (Regi & Lester Williams Extended Remix) – 4:10

Armada / Mostiko, 6 January 2017
"What Is Love 2016" (Mike Mago Remix) – 3:29
"What Is Love 2016" (Zonderling Remix) – 3:11
"What Is Love 2016" (Galactic Marvl Remix) – 2:54
"What Is Love 2016" (Rose Remix) – 3:08
"What Is Love 2016" (Mike Mago Extended Remix) – 5:49
"What Is Love 2016" (Zonderling Extended Remix) – 4:27
"What Is Love 2016" (Rose Extended Remix) – 4:08
"What Is Love 2016" (Dimitri Vegas & Like Mike Remix) – 3:29

Charts

Weekly charts

Year-end charts

Certifications

See also
List of Dutch Top 40 number-one singles of 1993
List of number-one hits of 1993 (Austria)
List of number-one hits of 1993 (Italy)
List of number-one singles of 1993 (Finland)
List of number-one singles of 1993 (France)
List of number-one singles of 1993 (Spain)
List of number-one singles of the 1990s (Switzerland)
VG-lista 1964 to 1994
VRT Top 30 number-one hits of 1993

References

External links

1993 debut singles
1993 songs
2009 singles
2016 singles
Dutch Top 40 number-one singles
European Hot 100 Singles number-one singles
Haddaway songs
Irish Singles Chart number-one singles
Kiesza songs
Lost Frequencies songs
Number-one singles in Austria
Number-one singles in Denmark
Number-one singles in Finland
SNEP Top Singles number-one singles
Number-one singles in Italy
Number-one singles in Norway
Number-one singles in Portugal
Number-one singles in Spain
Number-one singles in Switzerland
Number-one singles in Zimbabwe
Songs written by Tony Hendrik
Ultratop 50 Singles (Flanders) number-one singles
Music videos directed by Volker Hannwacker
Armada Music singles
Arista Records singles